Ahmadabad-e Mostowfi Rural District is in Ahmadabad-e Mostowfi District of Eslamshahr County, Tehran province, Iran. At the National Census of 2006, its population was 14,154 in 3,510 households. There were 15,887 inhabitants in 4,147 households at the following census of 2011. At the most recent census of 2016, the population of the rural district was 3,910 in 935 households. The largest of its four villages was Hasanabad-e Khaleseh, with 3,568 people.

References 

Eslamshahr County

Rural Districts of Tehran Province

Populated places in Tehran Province

Populated places in Eslamshahr County